Railroad Borough Historic District is a national historic district located at Railroad Borough in York County, Pennsylvania. The district includes 45 contributing buildings in Railroad. Most of the buildings date between 1840 and 1920, and were developed in two narrow stream valleys.  The buildings reflect the borough's role as a Northern Central Railway freight depot and manufacturing center.

It was listed on the National Register of Historic Places in 1984.

References 

Historic districts on the National Register of Historic Places in Pennsylvania
Greek Revival architecture in Pennsylvania
Italianate architecture in Pennsylvania
Historic districts in York County, Pennsylvania
National Register of Historic Places in York County, Pennsylvania